Woosong Technical College was a college in Daejeon, South Korea. In 2008 now-Ministry of Education granted its closure and its merger with Woosong University into Woosong University.

External links 
 Official website (Korean)

See also 
 List of colleges and universities in South Korea
 Education in South Korea

References 

Universities and colleges in Daejeon
Defunct universities and colleges in South Korea